The Indian cricket team toured the Caribbean from 26 June to 5 July 2009 for a four-match One Day International series against the West Indies. This tour was India's reciprocal tour of the Caribbean, after West Indies visited them in January 2007. The series was won 2–1 by India.

Background
India arrived in the Caribbean on the back of a strong performances in One Day Internationals (ODIs) having lost only three of their last 18 games. The team arrived two days after the World Twenty20 had ended, a tournament that the West Indies performed well in, that followed their poor show in the tour of England that year.

Squads

India team regulars Sachin Tendulkar, Zaheer Khan, Virender Sehwag and Suresh Raina were rested either due to injuries or fatigue, the latter on account of busy season that included the Indian Premier League. In their place, Ashish Nehra, Abhishek Nayar, R. P. Singh, Ravindra Jadeja, Subramaniam Badrinath and Murali Vijay were included in the squad. The West Indies squad was announced on 20 June for the first two ODIs. Darren Bravo and Narsingh Deonarine were included in the squad owing to their strong performances in the domestic circuit. All-rounder David Bernard was included as a replacement for an injured Fidel Edwards. The same squad was retained for the final two games.

ODI series

1st ODI

2nd ODI

3rd ODI

4th ODI

Media coverage

Television networks
Ten Sports (live) — India, Bangladesh, Nepal, Europe, Middle East, Japan, Hong Kong, Indonesia, Sri Lanka and Maldives 
Doordarshan (live) — India 
Sky Sports (live) — United Kingdom
SuperSport (live) — South Africa, Zimbabwe and Kenya
Fox Sports (highlights) — Australia

References

External links
 Series home at ESPN Cricinfo

2009 in Indian cricket
2009 in West Indian cricket
Indian cricket tours of the West Indies
International cricket competitions in 2009
West Indian cricket seasons from 2000–01